S. S. Ramanitharan is an Indian politician and incumbent member of the Tamil Nadu Legislative Assembly from the Anthiyur constituency. He represents the Anna Dravida Munnetra Kazhagam party.

References 

Members of the Tamil Nadu Legislative Assembly
All India Anna Dravida Munnetra Kazhagam politicians
Living people
Year of birth missing (living people)
Place of birth missing (living people)